Tradeweb Markets Inc. (Tradeweb) is an international financial services company that builds and operates electronic over-the-counter (OTC) marketplaces for trading fixed income products, ETFs, and derivatives. The company was co-founded in 1996 by Lee Olesky and Jim Toffey. Its customers include banks, asset managers, central banks, pension funds and insurance companies.

Tradeweb's headquarters are in New York City.

History

Tradeweb was launched in 1998, creating the first multi-dealer online trading network for U.S. Treasuries. In 2000, the firm opened its London office and launched marketplaces for trading European government bonds and agencies.

The firm was privately held until 2004, when it was acquired by Thomson Corporation (now Thomson-Reuters) for $535 million. Tradeweb established its Tokyo office in 2005, starting a partnership with CanDeal to launch Canadian debt securities trading. That  year, the firm grew by introducing marketplaces for interest rate swaps, credit default swap indices, and repo.

In 2006, Tradeweb Retail was established as the firm entered the retail fixed income marketplace through the acquisition of Lever-Trade, a provider of web-based fixed income management systems for the retail marketplace. In 2007, Thomson Financial, a unit of Thomson, announced its plans to expand electronic trading by creating a strategic partnership with nine other global dealers through Tradeweb, valuing the company at $1.55 billion.

In 2008, Olesky became CEO. That same year, the firm acquired brokerage firm Hilliard Farber & Co. Inc. In 2009, it launched Dealerweb, an electronic interdealer platform for to-be-announced, or forward, mortgage-backed securities (TBA-MBS). In 2010, it facilitated the first fully electronic, dealer-to-customer interest rate swap to be processed by a central clearing house in the U.S.

In 2011, it acquired the brokerage assets of Rafferty Capital Markets LLC (RaffCap) and the municipal bond broking business of J.J. Kenny Drake. In 2013, the firm secured CFTC temporary approval of two wholly owned swap execution facilities (SEFs) TW SEF and DW SEF. Live SEF trading on the platforms began on October 2, 2013. In November 2013, the firm  acquired BondDesk Group, a bond trading venue in the U.S. for advisors and middle market investors, and integrated the businesses, technology, services and support of its existing Tradeweb Retail trading platform with BondDesk, and rebranded the combined service Tradeweb Direct.

In May 2014, Tradeweb and BlackRock announced a strategic partnership in electronic trading in rates and derivatives markets for BlackRock's Aladdin clients. In June 2014, Tradeweb launched active U.S. Treasury bond trading on the Dealerweb platform, supporting trading of the most liquid on-the-run Treasury bonds with participation from dealers and several electronic market-making firms. In October 2014, the company announced the launch of its U.S. institutional corporate bond platform.

In February 2016, Tradeweb launched an OTC marketplace for U.S.-listed ETFs aimed at institutional investors. In March 2016, the company acquired CodeStreet LLC. In October 2016, Tradeweb, along with FTSE Russell, was named a provider of Gilt and Treasury Bill end-of-day reference pricing by the U.K. Treasury. The same month, the firm became one of four electronic trading platforms to launch the Electronic Debt Markets Association Europe (EDMA Europe), which was formed to develop and promote collective member views on regulatory developments affecting electronic fixed income trading venues in Europe.

In January 2017, the firm announced the launch of an Approved Publication Arrangement (APA) service to allow market participants to meet post-trade requirements mandated by the Markets in Financial Instruments Directive (MiFID) II.

In March 2017, Citadel Securities became a liquidity provider on the Tradeweb institutional U.S. Treasury marketplace, expanding its role on the platform beyond IRS, CDS indices, and U.S. ETFs.  The firm announced the launch of all-to-all trading on its U.S. institutional credit platform in April, enabling clients to trade with more than 130 dealers. In June 2017, it became the first offshore trading platform to connect with C hina Foreign Exchange Trade System (CFETS), allowing investors outside of China to invest in the China Interbank Bond Market for the first time. In 2017, the firm  also made a strategic investment in DealVector, Inc., a fixed income asset registry and communication platform.

In May 2018, Tradeweb partnered with Plato to launch eBlock, a European cash equities block trading platform. In August 2018, it launched an RFQ platform for US equity options allowing traders to send multiple price requests to multiple liquidity providers.

Tradeweb tendered an IPO on April 3, 2019. According to Bloomberg, its offering was the best-performing IPO exceeding $1 billion for 2019. Also in 2019, the Federal Housing Finance Agency announced it was partnering with Tradeweb to begin trading a single security for mortgages backed by Fannie Mae and Freddie Mac. In September 2019, Tradeweb and Intercontinental Exchange launched Tradeweb ICE U.S. Treasury Closing Prices, which calculates and publishes more than 900 Treasury securities prices daily, and in October the firm expanded portfolio trading for corporate bonds. In 2020, the firm's average daily trading volume across all asset classes exceeded $837 billion.

In June 2021, Tradeweb acquired Nasdaq’s U.S. fixed income electronic trading platform, formerly known as eSpeed for $190 million in cash.

In June 2022, Tradeweb announced a partnership with FXall, the foreign exchange aggregator run by the London Stock Exchange Group, which majority owns Tradeweb, that would have the two companies work on solutions for emerging market currency swaps and bonds.

In June 2022, Tradeweb also announced a joint venture with Bloomberg and MarketAxess to provide a consolidated tape for bond prices in European capital markets that would operate independently from its existing business. At the time of the announcement, it already operated its own APA. This move was in response to a long-standing effort by European authorities to unify their capital markets and improve trade data quality, and it might be the first move in bringing a single feed to many asset classes. Once implemented, European capital markets would be more similar to those of the U.S., which has TRACE.

Management
Billy Hult is the current CEO of Tradeweb. He was President prior to this and played a key role in the firm's growth and acquisitions. He joined the firm in 2000 from Société Générale.

Hult replaced Lee Olesky, who was CEO until this the time of the transition and then became non-executive Chairman of the Board. Olesky was previously Chief Operating Officer for Credit Suisse First Boston (CSFB)'s Fixed Income Americas division. While at CSFB, Olesky completed the initial business plan for introducing institutional electronic trading of U.S. securities in 1996. After launching Tradeweb in 1998 and serving as chairman, Olesky left CSFB and co-founded BrokerTec Global, a competing trading platform. He rejoined Tradeweb as President in 2002 and became CEO in 2008.

Replacing Hult as President was Thomas Pluta, who joined from JP Morgan where he was most recently global head of linear rates trading and co-head of North America rates trading.

As of January 2023, the management structure was as follows:

 Billy Hult, Chief Executive Officer
 Thomas Pluta, President
 Sara Furber, Chief Financial Officer
 Chris Bruner, Chief Product Officer
 Enrico Bruni, Managing Director, Head of Europe and Asia Business
 Douglas Friedman, General Counsel
 Justin Peterson, Chief Technology Officer
 Fred Strobel, Global Head of Human Resources
 Scott Zucker, Chief Risk and Administrative Officer

See also 
Bloomberg L.P.
CME Group
MarketAxess
Nasdaq

References

External links
 

American companies established in 1998
Financial services companies established in 1998
Financial services companies based in New York City
Publicly traded companies based in New York City
Electronic trading platforms
Online financial services companies of the United States
Online marketplaces of the United States
Internet properties established in 1998
2004 mergers and acquisitions
2019 initial public offerings
Companies listed on the Nasdaq
London Stock Exchange Group